Hecho en México (1985) (Made in Mexico) is the second studio album by Mexican Rock'n roll band El Tri.

Track listing 

 "Hasta Que el Cuerpo Aguante" (Until The Body Holds On) (Alex Lora, Sergio Mancera) – 2:05
 "La Balada" (The Ballad) (Lora, Mancera) – 4:21
 "Era Un Mar" (It Was A Sea) (Lora, Mancera) – 4:11
 "Mente Rockera" (Rocking Mind) (Lora) – 4:14
 "Nunca Digas Que No" (Never Say No) (Lora) – 5:11
 "Enciende el Cerebro" (Turn On The Brain) (Lora) – 3:20
 "Una y Otra Vez" (Over And Over) (Limón, Lora) – 2:34
 "F.Z. 10" (Cruz, Lora) – 3:05

Personnel 

 Alex Lora – guitar, vocals
 Rafael Salgado – harmonic
 Sergio Mancera – electric & rhythm guitar
 Arturo Labastida – sax
 Mariano Soto – drums

External links
www.eltri.com.mx
Hecho en Méxicol at Musicbrainz
[ Hecho en México] at Allmusic

El Tri albums
1985 albums
Warner Music Group albums